Local government elections took place in London, and some other parts of the United Kingdom on Thursday 7 May 1998.

All London borough council seats were up for election.

The 1998 Greater London Authority referendum was held in the same voting locations.

Results summary

Turnout: 1,738,868 voters cast ballots, a turnout of 34.8% (-11.4%).

Councils results

Overall councillor numbers

|}

Borough result maps

References

 
May 1998 events in the United Kingdom
1998